Dissociative fugue, formerly called a fugue state or psychogenic fugue, is a mental and behavioral disorder that is classified variously as a dissociative disorder, a conversion disorder, and a somatic symptom disorder. The disorder is a rare psychiatric phenomenon characterized by reversible amnesia for one's identity, including the memories, personality, and other identifying characteristics of individuality. The state can last for days, months, or longer. Dissociative fugue usually involves unplanned travel or wandering and is sometimes accompanied by the establishment of a new identity. It is a facet of dissociative amnesia, according to the fifth edition of the Diagnostic and Statistical Manual of Mental Disorders (DSM-5).

After recovery from a fugue state, previous memories usually return intact, and further treatment is unnecessary. An episode of fugue is not characterized as attributable to a psychiatric disorder if it can be related to the ingestion of psychotropic substances, to physical trauma, to a general medical condition or to dissociative identity disorder, delirium, or dementia. Fugues are precipitated by a series of long-term traumatic episodes. It is most commonly associated with childhood victims of sexual abuse who learn to dissociate memory of the abuse (dissociative amnesia).

Signs and symptoms
Symptoms of a dissociative fugue include mild confusion and once the fugue ends, possible depression, grief, shame, and discomfort. People have also experienced a post-fugue anger. Another symptom of the fugue state can consist of loss of one's identity.

Diagnosis

A doctor might suspect dissociative fugue when people seem confused about their identity or are puzzled about their past or when confrontations challenge their new identity or absence of one. The doctor reviews symptoms and does a physical examination to exclude physical disorders that may contribute to or cause memory loss.

Sometimes dissociative fugue cannot be diagnosed until people return to their pre-fugue identity and are distressed to find themselves in unfamiliar circumstances, sometimes with awareness of "lost time". The diagnosis is usually made retroactively when a doctor reviews the history and collects information that documents the circumstances before people left home, the travel itself, and the establishment of an alternative life.

Functional amnesia can also be situation-specific, varying from all forms and variations of traumas or generally violent experiences, with the person experiencing severe memory loss for a particular trauma. Committing homicide; experiencing or committing a violent crime such as rape or torture; experiencing combat violence; attempting suicide; and being in automobile accidents and natural disasters have all induced cases of situation-specific amnesia (Arrigo & Pezdek, 1997; Kopelman, 2002a). As Kopelman (2002a) notes, however, care must be exercised in interpreting cases of psychogenic amnesia when there are compelling motives to feign memory deficits for legal or financial reasons. However, although some fraction of psychogenic amnesia cases can be explained in this fashion, it is generally acknowledged that true cases are not uncommon. Both global and situationally specific amnesia are often distinguished from the organic amnesic syndrome, in that the capacity to store new memories and experiences remains intact. Given the very delicate and oftentimes dramatic nature of memory loss in such cases, there usually is a concerted effort to help the person recover their identity and history. This will allow the subject to be recovered sometimes spontaneously when particular cues are encountered.

Definition
The cause of the fugue state is related to dissociative amnesia, (Code 300.12 of the DSM-IV codes) which has several other subtypes: selective amnesia, generalized amnesia, continuous amnesia, and systematized amnesia, in addition to the subtype "dissociative fugue".

Unlike retrograde amnesia (which is popularly referred to simply as "amnesia", the state where someone forgets events before brain damage), dissociative amnesia is not due to the direct physiological effects of a substance (e.g., a drug of abuse, a medication, DSM-IV Codes 291.1 & 292.83) or a neurological or other general medical condition (e.g., amnestic disorder due to a head trauma, DSM-IV Code 294.0). It is a complex neuropsychological process.

As the person experiencing a dissociative fugue may have recently experienced the reappearance of an event or person representing an earlier life trauma, the emergence of an armoring or defensive personality seems to be for some, a logical apprehension of the situation.

Therefore, the terminology "fugue state" may carry a slight linguistic distinction from "dissociative fugue", the former implying a greater degree of "motion". For the purposes of this article, then, a "fugue state" occurs while one is "acting out" a "dissociative fugue".

The DSM-IV defines "dissociative fugue" as:

sudden, unexpected travel away from home or one's customary place of work, with inability to recall one's past
confusion about personal identity, or the assumption of a new identity
significant distress or impairment

The Merck Manual defines "dissociative fugue" as:

 One or more episodes of amnesia in which the inability to recall some or all of one's past and either the loss of one's identity or the formation of a new identity occur with sudden, unexpected, purposeful travel away from home.

In support of this definition, the Merck Manual further defines dissociative amnesia as:

 An inability to recall important personal information, usually of a traumatic or stressful nature, that is too extensive to be explained by normal forgetfulness.

Prognosis 
The DSM-IV-TR states that the fugue may have a duration from days to months, and recovery is usually rapid. However, some cases may be refractory. An individual usually has only one episode.

Cases
Shirley Ardell Mason (1923–1998), also known as "Sybil", would disappear and then reappear with no recollection of what happened during the time span. She recalled "being here and then not here" and having no identity of herself. It was claimed by her psychiatrist, Cornelia Wilbur, that she also had dissociative identity disorder. Wilbur's diagnosis of DID was disputed by Wilbur's contemporary Herbert Spiegel.
Jody Roberts, a reporter for the Tacoma News Tribune, disappeared in 1985, only to be found 12 years later in Sitka, Alaska, living under the name of "Jane Dee Williams". While there were some initial suspicions that she had been faking amnesia, some experts have come to believe that she genuinely experienced a protracted fugue state.
David Fitzpatrick, who had dissociative fugue disorder, was profiled in the UK on Five's television series Extraordinary People. He entered a fugue state on December 4, 2005, and was working on regaining his entire life's memories at the time of his appearance in his episode of the documentary series.
Hannah Upp, a teacher originally from Salem, Oregon, was given a diagnosis of dissociative fugue after she had disappeared from her New York home in August 2008 and was rescued from the New York Harbor 20 days later. News coverage at the time focused on her refusal to speak to detectives right after she was found  and the fact that she was seen checking her email at Apple Stores while she was missing. This coverage has since led to criticism of the often "condemning and discrediting" attitude toward dissociative conditions. On September 3, 2013, she went into another fugue, disappearing from her new job as a teacher's assistant at Crossway Community Montessori in Kensington, Maryland. She was found unharmed September 5, 2013, in Wheaton, Maryland. As of September 14, 2017, she was missing again; she was last seen near Sapphire Beach in her home in St. Thomas right before Hurricane Maria. Three months later her mother and a group of friends were searching for her in the Virgin Islands and surrounding areas.
Jeff Ingram appeared in Denver in 2006 with no memory of his name or where he was from. After his appearance on national television, to appeal for help identifying himself, his fiancée called Denver police identifying him. The episode was diagnosed as dissociative fugue. As of December 2012, Ingram had experienced three incidents of amnesia: in 1994, 2006, and 2007.
Doug Bruce "came to" on a subway train claiming to have no memory of his name or where he was from, nor any identification documents.
Bruneri-Canella case (alleged reappearance of a man who had gone missing in World War I)
Benjaman Kyle
Agatha Christie (possibly)

See also

Depersonalization disorder (DSM-IV Dissociative Disorders 300.6)
Dissociation (psychology)
Dissociative disorders (DSM-IV Dissociative Disorders)
Dissociative identity disorder (formerly multiple personality disorder) (DSM-IV Dissociative Disorders 300.14)
Dromomania, a similar historical diagnosis
Psychogenic amnesia; dissociative amnesia (formerly psychogenic amnesia) (DSM-IV Dissociative Disorders 300.12)
Structured Clinical Interview for DSM-IV
Lost Highway, a film by David Lynch that explores the disorder
Paris, Texas, a film by Wim Wenders where the protagonist (Harry Dean Stanton) portrays and must cope with the disorder

References

External links 

"Dissociative Fugue" from the Merck & Co. website.

Dissociative disorders
Memory disorders
Symptoms and signs of mental disorders